Amphisbaena frontalis is a species of worm lizards found in Brazil.

References

frontalis
Reptiles described in 1991
Endemic fauna of Brazil
Reptiles of Brazil
Taxa named by Paulo Vanzolini